Gavi is a tiny island in the Tyrrhenian Sea off the west
coast of Italy.
north shore of Ponza.

The island is quite rugged and uninhabited by humans. It has been
dedicated as a wildlife refuge and is home to a variety of lizard which
is found only here, as well as to mice, rabbits and scorpions.

See also
 List of islands of Italy

Islands of Lazio
Nature reserves in Italy
Uninhabited islands of Italy